Nebo je malo za sve (trans. The Sky Is Not Big Enough for All) is the debut studio album from Serbian and Yugoslav hard rock band Kerber, released in 1983.

Background and recording
Formed in Niš in 1981, Kerber spent first two years of their activity performing across Serbia and working on material for their debut album. The songs were composed by all of the members, while the lyrics were written by the band's drummer Zoran Stamenković. In May 1983, the band won the first place at Subotica Youth Festival with the song "Mezimac" ("Minion"), and in July went into the studio to record their debut album. The album was recorded during July 1983 in Aquarius Studio in Belgrade, and was produced by Gordon Rowley, bass guitarist for the British heavy metal band Nightwing. The album was mixed in Strawberry Studios in Manchester and released on ZKP RTLJ record label.

Track listing

Personnel

Kerber
Goran Šepa - vocals
Tomislav Nikolić - guitar
Branislav Božinović - keyboards, backing vocals
Zoran Žikić - bass guitar, backing vocals
Zoran Stamenković - drums

Additional Personnel
Gordon Rowley - produced by, mixed by, backing vocals (on track 8)
Đorđe Petrović - recorded by
Ratko Ostojić - recorded by
Chris Jones - mixed by
Malcolm Davis - mastered by
Slavoljub Stanković - cover design
Sava Kostadinović - photography

Reissue
The remastered version of the album was released in 2009 by PGP-RTS.

Reception and legacy
The album became an immediate success, with 10,000 copies sold during the first week of the album sale. The album brought nationwide hits "Mezimac", "Nebo je malo za sve" and "Heroji od staniola". After the album release, Kerber performed as the opening band on Uriah Heep concerts in Yugoslavia.

In 2011, the song "Mezimac" was polled, by the listeners of Radio 202, one of 60 greatest songs released by PGP-RTB/PGP-RTS during the sixty years of the label's existence.

The list of 100 Greatest Yugoslav Hard & Heavy Anthems published by web magazine Balkanrock in 2021 features six songs from the album: "Mezimac" (ranked 9th) "Nebo je malo za sve" (ranked 17th), "Bele utvare" (ranked 29th), "Kao tvoj Kerber" (ranked 45th), "Samo ti (Svemu si lek)" (ranked 59th) and "Heroji od staniola" (ranked 71st).

Covers
Serbian progressive/power metal band Alogia released a cover of "Mezimac", as well as a cover of "Hajde da se volimo" ("Let's Make Love") from Kerber's 1986 album Seobe (Migrations), on their 2006 live album Priče o vremenu i životu – Live at SKC (Tales of Time and Life – Live at SKC). Goran Šepa made a guest appearance on the songs.

References

Nebo je malo za sve at Discogs

External links
Nebo je malo za sve at Discogs

Kerber albums
1983 debut albums
ZKP RTLJ albums
Heavy metal albums by Serbian artists
Heavy metal albums by Yugoslav artists